"Goldmine" is a song co-written, co-produced and performed by New Zealand recording artist Kimbra, issued as the third single from her second studio album The Golden Echo.

Critical reception
"Goldmine" has received positive reviews from critics, with many complimenting the song's R&B-ish sound. Stan Mahoney of The Guardian complimented the song's "rising R&B chant" as a seemingly welcome "departure from [Kimbra's] art pop stereotype"; while Sasha Geffen of Consequence of Sound called Kimbra's vocals on the song "elastic" while also stating that the song has the strongest chorus on the album. Ryan Reed of Paste echoed this notion, highlighting the song as "the album's true centerpiece".

Music video
The official music video for "Goldmine" was filmed in a factory in Berlin. It was shot in black-and-white using a high amount of stop-motion animation; and was directed by Chester Travis and Timothy Armstrong.

Critical reception
The music video has received critical acclaim. Rolling Stone called the video "stunning"; while Paley Martin of Billboard proclaimed it as "an artful and edgy [...] piece set to a soul-piercing soundtrack". Scott Heins of Okayplayer described the video as "hypnotic".

References

External links
 

2014 songs
2015 singles
Kimbra songs
Song recordings produced by Rich Costey
Song recordings produced by John Hill (record producer)
Song recordings produced by Kimbra
Song recordings produced by Al Shux
Songs written by Kimbra
Songs written by Fraser T. Smith
Warner Records singles